A by-election for the seat of Arnhem in the Northern Territory Legislative Assembly was held on 7 October 1995. The by-election was triggered by the resignation of Wes Lanhupuy, from the Labor Party.

The Country Liberal Party selected two candidates for the seat- Terry Yumbulul and Mujiji Nunggarrgulu. The Labor Party stood Jack Ah Kit as their candidate. The remaining candidate was independent Lance Lawrence.

Results

Notes

References

Arnhem by-election
Northern Territory by-elections
Arnhem by-election